The GT World Challenge Europe Endurance Cup, formerly for sponsorship reasons the Blancpain Endurance Series from 2011 to 2015 and Blancpain GT Series Endurance Cup from 2016 to 2019, is a sports car racing series developed by SRO Motorsports Group and the Royal Automobile Club of Belgium (RACB) with approval from the Fédération Internationale de l'Automobile (FIA).  It features grand tourer racing cars modified from production road cars complying with the FIA's GT3 regulations. The series's goal is to be an endurance racing championship for GT3 cars, similar to the European Le Mans Series which uses GTE cars and Le Mans Prototypes. The series was primarily sponsored by Swiss watchmaker Blancpain, and the company's Lamborghini Super Trofeo series serve as support races.
In 2019, SRO announced that their sponsorship deal with Blancpain had been discontinued and the series was renamed the GT World Challenge Europe Endurance Cup for the 2020 season.

Format

The GT World Challenge Europe Endurance Cup reestablishes several elements of the former FIA GT Championship, with three hour endurance races held on European circuits such as Monza and Silverstone, as well as a continuation of the Spa 24 Hours.  The races feature five classes derived from the FIA's GT3, GT4, and Supersport regulations, with the GT3 cars divided into a class for professional driver line-ups (GT3 Pro), a class for a mixed team of professional and amateurs (GT3 Pro-Am), and a class for gentleman drivers who use cars at least one year old (GT3 Am). The FIA's ranking system for drivers is utilized in determining what class each entry is eligible for. The GT4 category remained its own class.

For the 2012 season, the GT4 and Supersport category were dropped and the GT3 Citation class was modified into the Gentlemen class. In 2013, grids have reached 60 cars for regular races.

The series uses extensive performance balancing and handicap weights to equalise the cars' performance.

Champions

Drivers

Teams

See also
 GT World Challenge Europe

References

External links

 
Sports car racing series
Group GT3
2011 establishments in Europe